Flight 85 or Flight 085 may refer to:

 Korean Air Flight 085, mistakenly thought hijacked on 11 September 2001
 Northwest Airlines Flight 85, experienced a rudder failure on 9 October 2002

0085